Atimia huachucae is a species of long-horned beetle in the family Cerambycidae. It is found in North America.

References

Further reading

 
 

Spondylidinae
Articles created by Qbugbot
Beetles described in 1922